The Cyprus Turkish Peace Force Command is the Turkish garrison in Cyprus. In 1974 Turkish troops invaded Cyprus following a Greek Cypriot coup d'état (organized and supported by the Greek government, which was still in the hands of a military junta) which wanted to force union with Greece, occupying the northern third of the island. The invasion force, which consisted of about 40,000 soldiers and 200 tanks. It outnumbers the Greek military contingent on the island, which is supplemented by the Greek Cypriot National Guard consisting of 12,000 active and 75,000 reserves. Air reinforcement of the Turkish troops can be effected, if necessary, within hours.

History

Turkey maintained the Cyprus Turkish Regiment (Kıbrıs Türk Alayı) in the northern part of the Republic of Cyprus. On 16 August 1960, the brigade was organized as follows:

Günyeli Group (Günyeli Grubu)
2nd Infantry Company (2 nci Piyade Bölüğü)
3rd Infantry Company (3 ncü Piyade Bölüğü)
Heavy Weapons Company (Ağır Silah Bölüğü)
Ortaköy Group (Ortaköy Grubu)
1st Infantry Company (1 nci Piyade Bölüğü)
4th Infantry Company (4 ncü Piyade Bölüğü)
Regimental HQ Company (Alay Karargâh Servis Bölüğü)

Invasion of Cyprus
In July 1974, Turkey landed forces on the northern part of Cyprus after the military coup of July 15, 1974. Turkish forces involved in operations were as follows:

An airborne (parachute) brigade (Commander: Brig. Gen. Sabri Evren)
A commando brigade (Commander: Brig. Gen. Sabri Demirbağ')
A Special Strike Force Landing Brigade (Turkish Marines) (Commander: Brig. Gen. Süleyman Tuncer)
The 39th Infantry Division (Commander: Maj. Gen. Bedrettin Demirel)
The 28th Infantry Division (Commander: Maj.Gen. Osman Fazıl Polat)

Post invasion
It has been on Cyprus since the Turkish invasion of 1974, and initially consisted of the following Turkish Army units:

 Cyprus Turkish Peace Force Command
28th Infantry Division - headquartered at Asha (Paşaköy) to the northeast of Nicosia, and the
39th Infantry Division - headquartered at Camlibel within the district of Girne.
14th Armoured Brigade - also in Asha (Paşaköy) with M48 Patton & M60 Patton tanks.
 A Special Force Regiment
 An Artillery Regiment
 Naval units

The corps reserve was at Kythrea (Değirmenlik) to the northeast of Nicosia.

Current (Post-2015)

 28th Mechanized Infantry Division (Paşaköy, Kyrenia) 
 39th Mechanized Infantry Division (Çamlıbel, Morphou) 
14th Armoured Brigade (Degirmenlik, Nicosia)
 49th Special Force Regiment
 41st Commando Regiment
 109th Field Artillery Regiment
 190th Marines Battalion
 Communications Battalion
 Central Command Military Police Battalion
 Logistics Support Group (Kyrenia)
TRNC Coast Guard Command ( 238 Staff 36 Coast Guard Boats )

Strength
The original force of 40,000 troops was reduced with Turkish authorities claiming that the Turkish force in Cyprus had been reduced to 17,500 in the 1990s. However, according to the UN Secretary-General “It is estimated that in recent years there have been in the northern part of the island a little under 30,000 armed forces of the Republic of Turkey (Turkish Forces) making it one of the most militarized areas in the world in terms of numbers of troops and numbers of civilian population. Recently moreover there have been indications that the total numbers of Turkish forces on the island may have increased” S994/680 7.6.1994.par.28.

Turkish forces in Cyprus are part of the Turkish Aegean Army which is headquartered at Izmir in Turkey. However, the commander of the Turkish troops reports directly to the Turkish General Staff in the capital, Ankara. The force is responsible for all security and is not directly involved in political matters of northern Cyprus.

Since 16 August 1974, the Turkish Army has retained control of the northern 36.2% of Cyprus.

Equipment in Northern Cyprus

Main Battle Tanks
 M48A5T1 and M48A5T2 - 287
 M48A5C - 9
M60A1 
M60A3 
Leopard 2A4 limited numbers

Armoured Fighting Vehicles
 FNSS Pars - 300
 FNSS ACV-15 - 126 
 Nurol Ejder - 126
ACV-300

Armoured Personnel Carriers
 M113A1 - 361
 AIFV - 90 
 Nurol Ejder - 190
Otokar Akrep - 67
Otokar Cobra - 32

Utility Vehicles 

 CJ3B
 Engerek - 150+

Self Propelled Howitzers
 M-110A2 - 12 
 M44T - 24 
 M52T - 36
T-155 Fırtına

Multiple Rocket Launchers
 T-122 Sakarya - 16
T-107 - 70
MGM-140 ATACMS - 12

Towed Howitzers
 M115 - 12
 M59 - 12
 M114A2 - 36
 M101A1 - 36
Panter howitzer - 36
Boran

Anti-Tank Missiles
 Kornet-E - 60
 TOW - 48 
 MILAN - 300
 M72 LAW 500+
 RPG-7

Recoilless Rifles
 M40 recoilless rifle - 170
M825 M40 carrier

Mortars
 M30 - 142
 HY-12 - 171
 MKEK 81 mm - 279

Anti-Aircraft
 Oerlikon GAI - 48
 Oerlikon GDF - 65
Rheinmetall Air Defence

Helicopters
 AS532 Cougar - 30

See also
 Security Forces Command
 Hellenic Force in Cyprus

Notes

References
 Cyprus Mail, Thursday, November 19, 1998
 Phileleftheros, Wednesday, November 18, 1998
 Cyprus News Agency, October 8, 1998
 Cyprus News Agency, November 21, 1997
 Cyprus News Agency, October 27, 1997
 The Military Balance 1996/97, The International Institute for Strategic Studies, London.
 2004 - 2005 Defence Bible (Stratigiki)
 "Cyprus, 1974", by T. Cooper and N. Tselepidis, published October 28, 2003 for ACIG.org.

External links 
 2007 letter from Cypriot Government to UN, giving details of Turkish forces in Cyprus
 The Cyprus Conflict A website with a selection of details, reports, documents, and personal accounts on the Cyprus dispute
 Chronology - Cyprus Issue
 Aspects of the Cyprus Problem from The Republic of Cyprus Press and Information Office
 Association Of Turkish Cypriots Abroad, A non-party-political organization with the aim of partitioning Cyprus

1974 establishments in Cyprus
1974 establishments in Turkey
Army units and formations of Turkey
Military of Cyprus
Military units and formations established in 1974
Northern Cyprus–Turkey relations
Overseas or abroad military installations